Dilum Amunugama is a Sri Lankan politician, Cabinet Minister, a member of the Parliament of Sri Lanka. He belongs to the Sri Lanka Podujana Peramuna. He is the nephew of Sarath Amunugama. He was appointed as the Minister of Transport and Industries on the 18th of April 2022.

Notes

References

Members of the 14th Parliament of Sri Lanka
Members of the 15th Parliament of Sri Lanka
Members of the 16th Parliament of Sri Lanka
Sri Lanka Freedom Party politicians
United People's Freedom Alliance politicians
Living people
Year of birth missing (living people)
Sinhalese politicians
Alumni of Trinity College, Kandy